Tellurium tetrachloride is the inorganic compound with the empirical formula TeCl4. The compound is volatile, subliming at 200 °C at 0.1 mmHg. Molten TeCl4 is ionic, dissociating into TeCl3+ and Te2Cl102−.

Structure
TeCl4 is monomeric in the gas phase, with a structure similar to that of SF4. In the solid state, it is a tetrameric cubane-type cluster, consisting of a Te4Cl4 core and three terminal chloride ligands for each Te. Alternatively, this tetrameric structure can be considered as a Te4 tetrahedron with face-capping chlorines and three terminal chlorines per tellurium atom, giving each tellurium atom a distorted octahedral environment

Synthesis
TeCl4 is prepared by chlorination of tellurium powder:
Te + 2 Cl2 → TeCl4
The reaction is initiated with heat.  The product is isolated by distillation.

Applications
TeCl4 is of occasional interest in organic synthesis. It adds to alkenes to give Cl-C-C-TeCl3 derivatives, wherein the Te can be subsequently removed with sodium sulfide. Electron-rich arenes react to give aryl Te compounds.  Thus, anisole gives TeCl2(C6H4OMe)2, which can be reduced to the diaryl telluride.

Safety considerations
As is the case for other tellurium compounds, TeCl4 is toxic.  It also releases HCl upon hydrolysis.

References

Tellurium(IV) compounds
Chlorides
Tellurium halides
Deliquescent substances
Chalcohalides